Burnet is a surname. Notable people with the surname include:

Alastair Burnet (1928–2013), British journalist.
Alexander Burnet (1615–1684), Scottish clergyman.
David G. Burnet (1788–1870), president of the Republic of Texas.
David Burnet (Quebec politician) (–1853), businessman and political figure in Lower Canada.
Frank Macfarlane Burnet (1895–1985), Australian biologist.
Gilbert Burnet (1643–1715), Scottish historian and Anglican bishop.
Guy Burnet (born 1983), English film, television and theatre actor. 
Isaac G. Burnet (1784–1856), Mayor of Cincinnati, Ohio.
Jacob Burnet (1770–1853), American jurist and statesman from Ohio. 
Jean Burnet (1920–2009), Canadian academic specializing in ethnic studies.
John Burnet (architect) (1814–1901), Scottish architect 
John Burnet (classicist) (1863–1928), Scottish classicist. 
John Burnet (painter) (1781 or 1784–1868), Scottish engraver and painter.
John James Burnet (1857–1938), Scottish Edwardian architect 
Lorenzo Burnet (born 1991), Dutch footballer
Noel Burnet (1904–1953), Australian koala expert
Robert Burnet, Lord Crimond (1592–1661), Scottish advocate and judge.
Ronnie Burnet (1918–1999), English cricketer and last amateur captain of Yorkshire County Cricket Club.
Thomas Burnet (1635?-1715), theologian and writer on cosmogony
William Burnet (1688–1729), British colonial administrator
William Burnet (1730–1791), American physician and political leader

See also
Burnett (surname)